Outlaws of the Panhandle is a 1941 American Western film directed by Sam Nelson and written by Paul Franklin. The film stars Charles Starrett, Frances Robinson, Stanley Brown, Norman Willis, Ray Teal and Lee Prather. The film was released on February 27, 1941, by Columbia Pictures.

Plot

Cast           
Charles Starrett as Jim Endicott
Frances Robinson as Doris Burnett
Stanley Brown as Neil Vaughn
Norman Willis as 'Faro Jack' Vaughn
Ray Teal as Walt Burnett
Lee Prather as Elihu Potter
Bob Nolan as Bob
Steve Clark as Lon Hewitt
Bud Osborne as Mart Monahan
Eddie Laughton as Chad
Richard Fiske as Britt
Jack Low as Dogger

References

External links
 

1941 films
American Western (genre) films
1941 Western (genre) films
Columbia Pictures films
Films directed by Sam Nelson
American black-and-white films
1940s English-language films
1940s American films